Sentry (real name Curtis Elkins) is a fictional character appearing in American comic books published by Marvel Comics. The character has been depicted as a member of The Jury and his rank is commanding officer.  His ethnicity is African-American.

Fictional character biography
Curtis Elkins was a Guardsman at the Vault a prison for super powered criminals. While there Curtis befriended Hugh Taylor, a new guardsman fresh out of the army. Curtis left the Vault sometime after Hugh was murdered by Venom during an escape.

After that Curtis and a few of his fellow Guardsmen joined The Jury, an agency organized by General Orwell Taylor. Their purpose was to track down and destroy Venom for his part in killing Hugh Taylor, Orwell's eldest son. To that end many of them were armed with sonic and fire generating weapons which the alien symbiote was vulnerable to.  After Orwell was arrested for his part in the Arachnis Project, the Jury was reformed by his younger son Maxwell to fit the principles of civil rights and the legal court system.  It was in fact a change done in accordance with Curtis' personal ideology of law and order.  At a final fight with Hybrid, he was seriously injured, not only by physical damage, but also by mental contact with the symbiotes. Later Sentry and the other members of the Jury would be led by U.S. Agent and financed by Edwin Cord. The Jury was sent after the Thunderbolts but failed.

Almost all of his later team members were his colleagues from the Vault, either those involved in the riot, or those involved in the Guardsmen at other times.  They include Screech (Maxwell Taylor), Ramshot (Samuel Caulkin), Bomblast (First Name Unknown, Last Name Parmenter), Firearm (Unknown), Wysper (Jennifer Stewart).

His former enemy Scott Washington aka Hybrid was also a guard in the Vault.

Powers and abilities
Sentry's armor and that of the other Jury members was based on that of the Guardsmen with notable upgrades designed to aid in the fight against Venom.  Sentry's strength is the greatest of them all.  He was strong enough to hold down Spider-Man in one of their fights.  He has flight technology made differently from the others, with a ramjet propulsion mini engine installed into his boots.  His whole costume is a green-brown color.  He has a powerful energy gun.  There's a picklock tool kit inside his right 
glove.

In other media

Television
Sentry appeared in the X-Men animated series in the episode "One Man's Worth (Part 1)".

Video Games 
Sentry appeared as a boss in Venom/Spider-Man: Separation Anxiety.

References

Appearances
 Venom: Lethal Protector #2-3
 Amazing Spider-Man #383-385
 Spider-Man: The Arachnis Project #1-6
 Venom: Sinner Takes All (1995) #1-4
 Venom: The Hunted (1996) #1-3
 Thunderbolts #23, 28, 32

External links
 
 Jury Profile at samruby.com
 Jury profile at marveldatabase.com

Characters created by David Michelinie
Characters created by Mark Bagley
Comics characters introduced in 1993
Fictional African-American people
Marvel Comics superheroes